The 2005 Holland Series was a series of baseball games held from September 24, 2005 to October 1, 2005 between the two Dutch play-off winners DOOR Neptunus and Mr. Cocker HCAW. The first team to have won three games in the best-of-five-games series became Dutch champions.

Results

External links
KNBSB-stats.nl
batting averages
batting totals
pitching averages
pitching totals
fielding averages
team totals
full team totals

Holland Series